Bernard (Barney) Wayne Rawlings (1920 – July 19, 2004) was an American Eighth Air Force pilot. He is noted for having been co-pilot of the B-17 bomber, "G.I. Sheets", which was shot down over Belgium in 1944 during World War II.

Biography 
After his plain was shot down, Rawlings was aided by resistance fighters in Belgium and France and made his way to Spain. After a brief incarceration, he was repatriated. 

Following the war, Barney Rawlings became a pilot for Trans World Airlines, ultimately becoming a 747 captain. He retired in 1987.

Legacy and recognition 
Rawlings' story is recounted in Half a Wing, Three Engines, and a Prayer by Brian D. O'Neill (McGraw-Hill Professional, 1999), and The Last Airman, by Roger Rawlings (Harper & Row, 1989).

A year prior to his retirement, he and the surviving members of his World War II crew returned to Belgium where, in the town of Solre-Saint-Géry, a granite monument had been erected in their honor - and, by extension, in honor of all Allied air crews who fought for the liberation of Europe.

The dedication ceremony included presentations by NATO, the United States Air Force, and the Belgian Air Force, which conducted a fly-over by four Belgian jet aircraft.

References

People from Missouri
1920 births
2004 deaths
United States Army Air Forces officers
United States Army Air Forces pilots of World War II

United States Army Air Forces personnel of World War II